Captain John Conn (c. 5 August 1764 – 4 May 1810) was a senior captain in the Royal Navy, whose career, which included service at the battles of the Saintes, the Glorious First of June, Copenhagen and Trafalgar, ended in a shipboard accident before he could reap the rewards of his long service. Conn could also claim membership of Nelson's "Band of Brothers", a clique of dashing naval officers who participated in Nelson's campaigns during the French Revolutionary and Napoleonic Wars, as well as a close friendship with the admiral himself, who once said: "A better or more zealous officer than Captain Conn is not in His Majesty's service."

Biography
Born to a Royal Navy warrant officer of Irish extraction, also named John Conn, he was baptised at Stoke Damerel, Devon, on 5 August 1764. In 1788 he was made a lieutenant, but had to wait five years before being given a good position, using the intervening time to marry Margaret Nelson, a vicar's daughter. Serving aboard the flagship  at the Glorious First of June, he came to the attention of Admiral Lord Howe. He commissioned the 12-gun gun vessel  in June 1797 but left her a year later. He was promoted to commander on 11 August 1800 and took command of the bomb vessel . At the first battle of Copenhagen his expertise caused terrible damage to the Danish fleet. Next, he participated in Nelson's bold but disastrous attack on the French invasion force in Boulogne shortly afterwards, commanding the division of gun-boats, and gaining his commanding officer's attention and respect.

His nine-year-old son Henry joined him on Culloden. Conn then transferred to the French prize  and joined Nelson in the Mediterranean at Nelson's request. In 1805 Conn was given temporary command of the first rate flagship  and his old ship Royal Sovereign whilst their commanders were on leave; his performance further contributed to his reputation as a reliable and steady officer. On 10 October he returned the Royal Sovereign to Admiral Collingwood and took command of the fast new second rate .

Eleven days later Conn and his crew were thrown into battle as the Franco-Spanish fleet attempted to break out of Cadiz. Situated halfway down Collingwood's division, Conn struggled to reach the action, only getting there around the time Nelson was mortally wounded in the northern division. Charging on from this victory, the Dreadnought engaged the Spanish flagship , mortally wounding the Spanish admiral Gravina, but being unable to defeat the enemy, which succeeded in escaping back to Cadiz. Conn even managed to rescue his prize, the San Juan Nepomuceno being one of only four captured enemy ships to survive the storm.

Admiral's rank and the honours which came with it were surely not far away when tragedy struck on 4 May when during the chase of a small French ship near Bermuda, Conn became over-eager, slipped and fell overboard. Swiftsure was halted and a search was conducted, but Conn had drowned before help arrived. His death was mourned in Britain and especially in the Navy where he was a popular and respected figure. Sir John Borlase Warren, an old commander and friend, expressed regret at the death of "so deserving an officer as Captain Conn."

References

Further reading

External links 
 
  
 Animation of the Battle of Trafalgar

1764 births
1810 deaths
Military personnel from Plymouth, Devon
Deaths by drowning
Royal Navy captains at the Battle of Trafalgar
Accidental deaths in Bermuda
Royal Navy personnel of the American Revolutionary War
Royal Navy personnel of the French Revolutionary Wars
Royal Navy personnel of the Napoleonic Wars